Agonopterix agyrella is a moth in the family Depressariidae. It was described by Rebel in 1917. It is found in Central Asia (Tannuola).

References

Moths described in 1917
Agonopterix
Moths of Asia